The 1901 Ohio Green and White football team was an American football team that represented Ohio University as an independent during the 1901 college football season. Led by Arlie C. Jones in his first and only season as head coach, the team compiled a 6–1–2 record and outscored opponents by a total of 108 to 43.

Schedule

References

Ohio
Ohio Bobcats football seasons
Ohio Green and White football